The Case of Charles Peace is a 1949 British crime film directed by Norman Lee and starring Michael Martin Harvey, Chili Bouchier and Valentine Dyall. It is based on the real-life Victorian murderer Charles Peace.

Cast
 Michael Martin Harvey as Charles Peace
 Chili Bouchier as Katherine Dyson
 Valentine Dyall as Storyteller Sir Clement Barnes KC
 Bruce Belfrage as Prosecution counsel Foster
 Ronald Adam as Defence counsel Lockwood
 Roberta Huby as Sue Thompson
 Peter Forbes-Robertson as William Habron
 Kathleen Rooney as Mary
 Richard Shayne as Arthur Dyson
 Jean Shepeard as Hannah Peace
 John Kelly as Father O'Brien
 Peter Gawthorne as Mr. Justice Lopes
 Hamilton Deane as Mr. Justice Hawkins
 Robert McLachlan as Mr. Justice Lindley
 Gordon Court as Inspector Phillips
 Bartlett Mullins as Mr. Brion
 Rose Howlett as Mrs. Brion
 Liam Gaffney as Leresche
 Howard Douglas as Littlewood
 Edward Evans as Police Sergeant (uncredited)

References

External links

1949 films
1949 crime films
1940s English-language films
Films directed by Norman Lee
British black-and-white films
British crime films
1940s British films